Michael Willrich is an American historian. He is the Leff Families Professor of History at Brandeis University, and the author of two books. He was a Guggenheim Fellow in 2015.

Selected works

References

Living people
Yale University alumni
University of Chicago alumni
Brandeis University faculty
American historians
Year of birth missing (living people)